This article shows the rosters of all participating teams at the women's field hockey tournament at the 2015 Pan American Games in Toronto. Rosters can have a maximum of 16 athletes.

The Argentine field hockey women's team that will compete at the 2015 Pan American Games:

Belén Succi
Macarena Rodríguez
Jimena Cedrés
Martina Cavallero
Delfina Merino
Agustina Habif
Florencia Habif
Rocío Sánchez Moccia
Agustina Albertario
Luciana Molina
Pilar Romang
Paula Ortiz
Noel Barrionuevo
Julia Gomes Fantasia
Josefina Sruoga
Florencia Mutio

Canada announced their squad on June 25, 2015. 

Thea Culley
Kate Gillis
Hannah Haughn
Danielle Hennig
Karli Johansen
Shanlee Johnston
Sara McManus
Stephanie Norlander
Abigail Raye
Maddie Secco
Natalie Sourisseau
Brienne Stairs
Holly Stewart
Alex Thicke
Kaitlyn Williams
Amanda Woodcroft

The Chile field hockey women's team that will compete at the 2015 Pan American Games:

Head Coach: Ronald Stein

Claudia Schüler (GK)
Sofía Walbaum
Javiera Villagra
Francisca Pizarro
Sofía Filipek
Carolina García
Francisca Vidaurre
Manuela Urroz
Camila Caram (C)
Francisca Tala
Daniela Caram
Constanza Palma
María Bastías
Denise Krimerman
Agustina Venegas
Josefa Villalabeitia

The Cuba field hockey women's team that will compete at the 2015 Pan American Games:

Yailyn Abrahan
Mileysi Argentel
Yusnaidy Betancourt
Helec Carta
Heidy González
Roseli Harrys
Ismary Hernández
Tahimi Licea
Yunia Milanés
Sunaylis Nikle
Yaniuska Paso
Brizaida Ramos
Annelis Reyna
Marisbel Sierra
Damnay Solis
Yuraima Vera

The Dominican Republic field hockey women's team that will compete at the 2015 Pan American Games:

Agustina Birocho
Yarinet de la Cruz
Cindy de la Rosa
Teresa de la Rosa
Soledad del Pino
María Disanti
Yenny León
Albania Marte
Benifer Moronta
Lucía Navamuel
Cecilia Oflaherti
Magalys Ortega
Nayrobi Pichardo
Daneiry Rivas
Julieta Roncati
Norma Sánchez

The Mexico field hockey women's team that will compete at the 2015 Pan American Games:

Maribel Acosta
Mireya Bianchi
Ahide Castillo
Cindy Correa
María Correa
Marlet Correa
Eliana Cota
Arlette Estrada
María Hinojosa
Montserrat Inguanzo
Ana Juarez
Michel Navarro
Karen Orozco
Fernanda Oviedo
Jéssica Sánchez
Jennifer Valdes

The United States field hockey women's team that will compete at the 2015 Pan American Games:

Jaclyn Briggs
Lauren Crandall
Rachel Dawson
Katelyn Falgowski
Stefanie Fee
Melissa González
Michelle Kasold
Kelsey Kolojejchick
Alyssa Manley
Kathleen O'Donnell
Julia Reinprecht
Katherine Reinprecht
Paige Selenski
Michelle Vittese
Jill Witmer
Emily Wold

Uruguay announced their squad on July 7, 2015.

Constanza Barrandeguy
Cecilia Casarotti
Mercedes Coates
Kaisuami Dallorso
Federika Kempner
Matilde Kliche
Lucía Laborde
Lucía Lamberti
Sofía Mora
Agustina Nieto
Florencia Norbis
Anastasia Olave
Rossana Paselle
Janine Stanley
Manuela Vilar del Valle
Soledad Villar

References

Rosters